Kfar Hess is a moshav in central Israel.

History
Before the 20th century the area formed part of the Forest of Sharon. It was an open woodland dominated by Mount Tabor Oak, which extended from Kfar Yona in the north to Ra'anana in the south. The local Arab inhabitants traditionally used the area for pasture, firewood and intermittent cultivation. The intensification of settlement and agriculture in the coastal plain during the 19th century led to deforestation and subsequent environmental degradation.

The village was founded in 1931 as part of the Settlement of the Thousand, and together with Herut, Ein Vered, Tel Mond and Kfar Ziv, it formed part of Gush Tel Mond (lit. Tel Mond Bloc). It was named after Moses Hess, a secular Jewish philosopher and one of the founders of socialism and Labour Zionist thought.

The founding group was organized under the Izrael organization, that was meant to settle in lands bought from the village Zarin in the outskirts of the Jezreel Valley, near Kfar Yehezkel. The idea for creating the new organization was conceived by the agricultural workers and Zionist pioneers, Nisan Boord and Mordechai Te'eni.

Notable residents
Giora Eiland
Ram Rothberg

References

External links

Village website 

Moshavim
Populated places established in 1931
1931 establishments in Mandatory Palestine
Populated places in Central District (Israel)